Ancistrus latifrons is a species of catfish in the family Loricariidae. It is native to South America, where it occurs in the basins of the Amazon River and the Solimões River. The species reaches 15.4 cm (6.1 inches) SL.

References 

latifrons
Catfish of South America
Fish described in 1869